Nizhnebaltachevo (Tübänge Baltas) is a rural locality (a selo) and the administrative centre of Nizhnebaltachevsky Selsoviet, Tatyshlinsky District, Bashkortostan, Russia. The population was 739 as of 2010. There are 7 streets.

Geography 
Nizhnebaltachevo is located 22 km southeast of Verkhniye Tatyshly (the district's administrative centre) by road. Verkhnebaltachevo is the nearest rural locality.

References 

Rural localities in Tatyshlinsky District